This is a list of Portuguese television related events from 2000.

Events
29 June - SIC launches their first pay TV channel SIC Gold.
3 September - The Portuguese version of Big Brother debuts.
September - In the second series of Quem quer ser milionário?, Maria Elisa Domingues becomes the first female host in the Millionaire franchise to crown a millionaire, when Ana Damásio wins the jackpot of 50 million escudos.
31 December - The first series of Big Brother is won by Zé Maria Seleiro.
Unknown - Nadia Sousa, performing as Edith Piaf wins the seventh and final series of Chuva de Estrelas.

Debuts
January - Quem quer ser milionário? (2000-2008, 2013–present)
3 September - Big Brother (2000-2003)

International
 Law & Order: Special Victims Unit (Unknown)

Television shows

Ending this year
Chuva da Estrelas (1993-2000)

Births

Deaths